The Sandakan District Mosque (Malay: Masjid Daerah Sandakan or also known as Masjid Besar Sim-Sim) is a mosque in Sandakan, Sabah, Malaysia. Built in 1985 and completed in 1989, it is the main mosque for the district of Sandakan. The mosque was officially opened in 1990.

In 2016, the mosque was visited by the Crown Prince of Perlis, Tuanku Syed Faizuddin Putra Jamalullail.

See also 
 Islam in Malaysia

References

External links 
 
 Sandakan District Mosque information on IslamGRID: 2.0

Mosques in Sabah
Mosques completed in 1989
1989 establishments in Malaysia
Mosque buildings with domes
Buildings and structures in Sandakan